Michel Wintsch (born 1964) is a Swiss avant-garde jazz composer and pianist who has worked with musicians such as Franz Koglmann and Gerry Hemingway. In the 1980s he toured with the group Monkey's Touch.

Discography

References

External links
The Official Website of Michel Wintsch

Living people
Avant-garde jazz pianists
Avant-garde jazz composers
Swiss jazz pianists
Swiss jazz composers
1964 births
21st-century pianists